1,4-Dihydroxyanthraquinone, also called quinizarin or Solvent Orange 86, is an organic compound derived from anthroquinone. Quinizarin is an orange or red-brown crystalline powder. It is formally derived from anthraquinone by replacement of two hydrogen atoms by hydroxyl (OH) groups. It is one of ten dihydroxyanthraquinone isomers and occurs in small amounts (as a glycoside) in the root of the madder plant, Rubia tinctorum.

Production
Quinizarin is produced by the reaction of phthalic anhydride and 4-chlorophenol followed by hydrolysis of the chloride:

It can also be prepared less efficiently from phthalic anhydride and hydroquinone.

Uses
Quinizarin is an inexpensive dye that is used to colour gasoline and some heating oils.  It is used as an intermediate for the synthesis of indanthrene- and alizarin-derived dyes.  The OH groups can be replaced by chloride. Chlorination and bromination afford other dyes.  Amination (replacement of one OH by ArNH) with aniline derivatives followed by sulfonation affords other dyes such as Acid Violet 43. It is also used to form lake pigments with calcium, barium, and lead.

See also
Hydroxyanthraquinone
1,2-Dihydroxyanthraquinone (alizarin)
1,3-Dihydroxyanthraquinone (purpuroxanthin)
Trihydroxyanthraquinone
Quinalizarin (1,2,5,8-tetrahydroxyanthraquinone)

References

Anthraquinone dyes
Dihydroxyanthraquinones
Hydroquinones
3-Hydroxypropenals within hydroxyquinones